Sevastyanovo is a rural locality (a village) in Novlenskoye Rural Settlement, Vologodsky District, Vologda Oblast, Russia. The population was 205 as of 2002.

Geography 
Sevastyanovo is located 72 km northwest of Vologda (the district's administrative centre) by road. Mardasovo is the nearest rural locality.

References 

Rural localities in Vologodsky District